My Summer Car is a vehicle simulation game in development by Amistech Games. It was released in early access in October 2016.

Gameplay and setting

My Summer Car is set in the open world fictional area of Peräjärvi, Finland, during the summer of 1995. The main character is an 18-year-old who has the family home to himself while his parents are on holiday in Tenerife. The player attempts to assemble, restore, and upgrade a car, the Satsuma AMP (modeled after the Datsun 100A). In order to do this, the player must use the car parts that are inside the garage, as well as occasionally order new parts from a catalog.

At the start of the game, the car is entirely disassembled, and the player must place each part in its correct location, screwing in the bolts with the correct sized spanners. The player is not given any direction by the game as to how to build the car. While most parts only fit together correctly, it is possible to assemble the car incorrectly by leaving out or improperly placing parts such as an engine gasket or a bolt. Failing to assemble the car properly can lead to vehicle failure if the car is driven. In addition to assembly, the player must provide the car with gasoline, motor oil, radiator coolant, and brake fluid.

In addition to building the vehicle, the player must address the various survival aspects of the game, such as balancing hunger, thirst, fatigue, urine, stress, and dirtiness. In order to take care of his needs, the player can buy food, beverages, and other supplies from the store. The player may also use the facilities at his house, such as the sink, shower, sauna, toilet, and bed. The player's needs can also be addressed through swimming in the lake, drinking alcohol, smoking, or successfully performing tasks related to the completion of the car.

To earn money for car parts, fuel, and shopping at the store, the player can perform various side-tasks for people around the area. The tasks are performed either using materials from the player's property, or with the various pre-assembled vehicles that the player can access. The tasks include taking junk cars to the mechanic, delivering firewood on a tractor-pulled trailer, using a vacuum truck to empty the septic tanks of neighbors, making and selling kilju (Finnish homebrew sugar wine), and picking up an intoxicated neighbor from the town pub early in the morning.
After the Satsuma passes inspection at the vehicle inspection office, the player can install certain aftermarket parts that enable the player to enter a weekly amateur rally for a chance to win a trophy and prize money.

In addition to these vehicles, there are several other vehicles that the player can obtain in the game. The player has access to a cargo van with a large carrying capacity, a two-stroke moped, and a two-stroke launch at a nearby dock that allows for travel across the map's lake. The player can borrow a muscle car from the local mechanic while he is servicing the player's vehicle, but the mechanic will trash the player's vehicle if the muscle car isn't returned on time. The player can also win a dilapidated station wagon that's infested with a wasp's nest from a ventti dealer.

Development
My Summer Car is primarily developed by a small independent development team consisting of Johannes Rojola ("ToplessGun"/"RoyalJohnLove") and Kaarina Rojola, with third parties assisting on music and voiceovers. Closed development and beta testing of the game had been documented as early as December 2013, with snippets of the development's progress seen on Rojola's YouTube channel and Twitter account. The game was released as an early access game via Steam's Greenlight program on October 24, 2016. Since then, the game has been incrementally updated with new features and overhauls several times.

A sequel, My Winter Car, was originally announced on May 29, 2020, but the release of the game has been delayed. In 2022, the game's developer published cryptically interpretable information about the game's possible release date on Steam.

Reception
The game received generally positive reviews. Writing for Rock, Paper, Shotgun, Brendan Caldwell called the game "Funny, detailed and thoroughly confusing." Nathan Grayson, in an article for Kotaku, called the game "Janky and weird as fuck, but fun." Both the Rock, Paper, Shotgun article and Eurogamer'''s Martin Robinson compared the game's difficulty curve to Dark Souls.My Summer Car has also received a number of awards and honors from the Finnish gaming community. At the 2017 , the game won the People's Choice Game of the Year 2016 "Kyöpelit" award. In 2018, My Summer Car'' was inducted into the Finnish Museum of Games among the museum's 100 game entries of that year.

References

External links
 

Upcoming video games
Early access video games
Indie video games
Open-world video games
Permadeath games
Single-player video games
Survival video games
Vehicle simulation games
Video games developed in Finland
Video games set in Finland
Video games set in the 1990s
Windows games
Windows-only games
Steam Greenlight games
First-person video games
Video games set in 1995